Jules Pasquier (1839-1928) was a French politician.

Early life
Jules Pasquier was born on 1 April 1839 in Goudelancourt-lès-Pierrepont, France. He was educated in Reims.

Career
Pasquier started his career as a civil law notary in 1866.

Pasquier joined the Popular Liberal Action, a conservative political party. He served as the Mayor of Autremencourt. He served as a member of the Chamber of Deputies from 22 September 1889 to 14 October 1893, and from 5 March 1905 to 31 May 1910. He voted against the 1905 French law on the Separation of the Churches and the State.

Death
He died on 10 March 1928 in Laon, France.

References

1839 births
1928 deaths
People from Aisne
Mayors of places in Hauts-de-France
Popular Liberal Action politicians
Members of the 5th Chamber of Deputies of the French Third Republic
Members of the 8th Chamber of Deputies of the French Third Republic
Members of the 9th Chamber of Deputies of the French Third Republic